The Fuller Warren Bridge is the prestressed-concrete girder bridge that carries Interstate 95 (I-95) across the St. Johns River in Jacksonville, Florida. The current structure was finished in October 2002, replacing the original bascule-bridge span, finished in 1954.

The current bridge was designed by HNTB Corporation in 1990 and built by Balfour Beatty Construction. It carries eight lanes across the span.

In the Spring of 2018 a construction project began to add two more lanes and a shared-use path to the bridge, with anticipated completion in Summer 2022.

The eastern end of the transcontinental Interstate 10 (I-10) meets I-95 just west of the bridge.

Naming
The bridge is named after former Florida governor Fuller Warren, former member and eventual denouncer of the KKK, who held the office from 1949 to 1953. He was a member of the Jacksonville City Council from 1931 to 1937.

Original bridge
The original bascule bridge was tolled until 1988, when the city of Jacksonville abolished toll collections. Increasing wear from heavy traffic, including a 1993 incident in which a  fragment of concrete broke loose, forced officials to ban large trucks from the bridge in 1998. It was permanently closed June 13, 2001, when all traffic was moved to the new Fuller Warren Bridge. After delays in removal because of legal and environmental concerns, the Florida Department of Transportation used explosives to complete demolition of the old bridge on February 17, 2007.

Switch to new bridge
Conversion from the old Fuller Warren Bridge to the new one began with one lane of southbound I-95 traffic on April 16, 2000. The new bridge, built at a cost of approximately $100 million, was opened to all eight lanes in late 2002 and formally dedicated on January 13, 2003.

Fuller Warren Expansion Project (2017)

About 2013, The Florida State Department of Transportation (FDOT) began the Your10&95 project to add operational improvements and enhancements to the I-10, I-95 highway interchange in metro Jacksonville. A planning department held several public meetings to discuss the proposed project and the cost of its construction with residents, community partners and businesses. They also asked for input from the public attendees. The meetings were held on February 10, 2014, on August 28, 2014 and on February 26, 2015. During those meetings, it was suggested that as part of the widening project to add two additional traffic lanes to the Fuller Warren bridge, a pedestrian shared use path should be added as well. The proposed path over the St. Johns River would connect the Riverside and Avondale historic neighborhood with the San Marco historic neighborhood. As the current bridge provides for no pedestrian or bicycle access, the FDOT agreed to implement the shared use path suggestion, as well as a number of other requests, such as adding traffic noise barriers for residents. The project also includes improvements to the I-10 ramps at Stockton and Irene streets. Construction began May 5, 2017 and was expected to be completed in the summer of 2020. See Shared Use Path (SUP) renderings. On the morning of October 4, 2018, a fatal accident involving one of the construction workers caused a temporary suspension of the work. By March, 2019 the project was near half way construction.

See also
 
 
 
 List of crossings of the St. Johns River

References

External links
 
 

Bridges completed in 1954
Bascule bridges in the United States
Bridges completed in 2002
Bridges in Jacksonville, Florida
Interstate 95
Former toll bridges in Florida
Tolled sections of Interstate Highways
Road bridges in Florida
Bridges over the St. Johns River
Bridges on the Interstate Highway System
2002 establishments in Florida
1954 establishments in Florida
Girder bridges in the United States
Concrete bridges in the United States